Cymbocarpa is a genus of flowering plants in the Burmanniaceae, first described as a genus in 1840. It is native to Central America, northern South America and the West Indies

 Species
 Cymbocarpa refracta Miers - Costa Rica, Panama, Cuba, Hispaniola, Jamaica, Venezuela, Colombia, Peru, Brazil 
 Cymbocarpa saccata Sandwith - Guyana, Peru, NW Brazil

References

Burmanniaceae
Dioscoreales genera
Parasitic plants